Brahma is a Hindu god, referred to as "the Creator" within the Trimurti, the trinity of supreme divinity that includes Vishnu and Shiva. He is associated with creation, knowledge, and the Vedas. Brahma is prominently mentioned in creation legends. In some Puranas, he created himself in a golden embryo known as the Hiranyagarbha.

Brahma is frequently identified with the Vedic god Prajapati. During the post-Vedic period, Brahma was a prominent deity and his sect existed; however, by the 7th century, he had lost his significance. He was also overshadowed by other major deities like Vishnu, Shiva, and Mahadevi and demoted to the role of a secondary creator, who was created by the major deities.

Brahma is commonly depicted as a red or golden-complexioned bearded man with four heads and hands. His four heads represent the four Vedas and are pointed to the four cardinal directions. He is seated on a lotus and his vahana (mount) is a hamsa (swan, goose or crane). According to the scriptures, Brahma created his children from his mind and thus, they are referred to as Manasaputra.

In contemporary Hinduism, Brahma does not enjoy popular worship and has substantially less important than the other two members of the Trimurti. Brahma is revered in the ancient texts, yet rarely worshiped as a primary deity in India, owing to the absence of any significant sect dedicated to his reverence. Few temples dedicated to him exist in India, the most famous being the Brahma Temple, Pushkar in Rajasthan. Some Brahma temples are found outside India, such as at the Erawan Shrine in Bangkok.

Origin and meaning
The origins of the term  are uncertain, partly because several related words are found in the Vedic literature, such as Brahman for the 'Ultimate Reality' and Brāhmaṇa for 'priest'. A distinction between the spiritual concept of brahman and the deity Brahmā is that the former is a genderless abstract metaphysical concept in Hinduism, while the latter is one of the many masculine gods in Hindu tradition. The spiritual concept of brahman is quite old and some scholars suggest that the deity Brahma may have emerged as a personification and visible icon of the impersonal universal principle of brahman. The existence of a distinct deity named Brahma is evidenced in late Vedic texts.

The former, the neuter form, has a generalized and abstract meaning while the latter, the masculine form, is used as the proper name of the deity Brahma.

Literature and legends

Vedic literature

One of the earliest mentions of Brahma with Vishnu and Shiva is in the fifth Prapathaka (lesson) of the Maitrayaniya Upanishad, probably composed around the late 1st millennium BCE. Brahma is first discussed in verse 5,1,  also called the Kutsayana Hymn, and then expounded in verse 5,2.

In the pantheistic Kutsayana Hymn, the Upanishad asserts that one's Soul is Brahman, and this Ultimate Reality, Cosmic Universal or God is within each living being. It equates the atman (Soul, Self) within to be Brahma and various alternate manifestations of Brahman, as follows, "Thou art Brahma, thou art Vishnu, thou art Rudra (Shiva), thou art Agni, Varuna, Vayu, Indra, thou art All."

In verse (5,2), Brahma, Vishnu, and Shiva are mapped into the theory of Guṇa, that is qualities, psyche and innate tendencies the text describes can be found in all living beings. This chapter of the Maitri Upanishad asserts that the universe emerged from darkness (tamas), first as passion characterized by innate quality (rajas), which then refined and differentiated into purity and goodness (sattva). Of these three qualities, rajas are then mapped to Brahma, as follows:

While the Maitri Upanishad maps Brahma with one of the elements of the guṇa theory of Hinduism, the text does not depict him as one of the trifunctional elements of the Hindu Trimurti idea found in later Puranic literature.

Post-Vedic, Epics and Puranas

During the post-Vedic period, Brahma was a prominent deity and his sect existed during the 2nd to 6th century CE. Early texts like Brahmananda Purana describe that there was nothing but an eternal ocean. From this, a golden egg called Hiranyagarbha, emerged. The egg broke open and Brahma, who had created himself within it, came into existence (gaining the name Swayambhu). Then, he created the universe, the earth and other things. He also created people to populate and live on his creation.

However, by the 7th century, Brahma lost his importance. Puranic legends mention various reasons for his downfall. There are primarily two prominent versions of why Brahma lost his ground. The first version refers to Shiva Purana, where Brahma and Vishnu argued about who was the greatest among them. Then suddenly, they heard a voice and saw a huge lightning pillar. The voice asked them to find out the end of the pillar and whoever could find the end of the pillar would be the greatest. Vishnu went toward the bottom and Brahma went toward the top. Vishnu came back and accepted his defeat that he couldn't find the end. However, Brahma returned and lied that he could find the top end. The pillar was Shiva Linga and the voice was of Shiva and this lie infuriated Shiva. Angry Shiva cursed Brahma that he would never be worshiped henceforth.

Historians believe that some of the major reasons for Brahma's downfall were the rise of Shaivism and Vaishnavism, their replacement of him with Shakti in the Smarta tradition and the frequent attacks by Buddhists, Jains and even by Hindu followers of Vaishnavas and Shaivites.

The post-Vedic texts of Hinduism offer multiple theories of cosmogony, many involving Brahma. These include Sarga (primary creation of the universe) and Visarga (secondary creation), ideas related to the Indian thought that there are two levels of reality, one primary that is unchanging (metaphysical) and other secondary that is always changing (empirical), and that all observed reality of the latter is in an endlessly repeating cycle of existence, that cosmos and life we experience is continually created, evolved, dissolved and then re-created. The primary creator is extensively discussed in Vedic cosmogonies with Brahman or Purusha or Devi among the terms used for the primary creator, In contrast the Vedic and post-Vedic texts name different gods and goddesses as secondary creators (often Brahma in post-Vedic texts), and in some cases a different god or goddess is the secondary creator at the start of each cosmic cycle (kalpa, aeon).

Brahma is a "secondary creator" as described in the Mahabharata and Puranas, and among the most studied and described. Some texts suggest that Brahma was born from a lotus emerging from the navel of the god Vishnu and from Lord Brahma's wrath, Shiva was born. In contrast, the Shiva-focused Puranas describe Brahma and Vishnu to have been created by Ardhanarishvara, half Shiva and half Parvati; or alternatively, Brahma was born from Rudra, or Vishnu, Shiva and Brahma creating each other cyclically in different aeons (kalpa). Yet others suggest the goddess Devi created Brahma, and these texts then state that Brahma is a secondary creator of the world working respectively on their behalf. Brahma creates all the forms in the universe, but not the primordial universe itself.  Thus in most Puranic texts, Brahma's creative activity depends on the presence and power of a higher god. Further, the medieval era texts of these major theistic traditions of Hinduism assert that the saguna (representation with face and attributes) Brahma is Vishnu, Shiva, or Devi, respectively.

In the post-Vedic Puranic literature, Brahma creates but neither preserves nor destroys anything. He is envisioned in some Hindu texts to have emerged from the metaphysical Brahman along with Vishnu (preserver), Shiva (destroyer), all other deities, matter and other beings. In theistic schools of Hinduism where the deity Brahma is described as part of its cosmology, he is a mortal like all deities and dissolves into the abstract immortal Brahman when the universe ends, A new cosmic cycle (kalpa) restarts.

In the Bhagavata Purana, Brahma is portrayed several times as the one who rises from the "Ocean of Causes". Brahma, states this Purana, emerges at the moment when time and universe are born, inside a lotus rooted in the navel of Hari (deity Vishnu, whose praise is the primary focus in the Purana). The scriptures assert that Brahma is drowsy, errs and is temporarily incompetent as he puts together the universe. He then becomes aware of his confusion and drowsiness, meditates as an ascetic, then realizes Hari in his heart, sees the beginning and end of the universe, and then his creative powers are revived. Brahma, states Bhagavata Purana, thereafter combines Prakriti (nature, matter) and Purusha (spirit, soul) to create a dazzling variety of living creatures, and a tempest of causal nexus. The Bhagavata Purana thus attributes the creation of Maya to Brahma, wherein he creates for the sake of creation, imbuing everything with both the good and the evil, the material and the spiritual, a beginning and an end.

The Puranas describe Brahma as the deity creating time. They correlate human time to Brahma's time, such as a mahākalpa being a large cosmic period, correlating to one day and one night in Brahma's existence.

The stories about Brahma in various Puranas are diverse and inconsistent. In Skanda Purana, for example, goddess Parvati is called the "mother of the universe", and she is credited with creating Brahma, gods, and the three worlds. She is the one, states Skanda Purana, who combined the three Gunas - Sattva, Rajas, and Tamas - into matter (Prakrti) to create the empirically observed world.

The Vedic discussion of Brahma as a Rajas-quality god expands in the Puranic and Tantric literature. However, these texts state that his wife Saraswati has Sattva (quality of balance, harmony, goodness, purity, holistic, constructive, creative, positive, peaceful, virtuous), thus complementing Brahma's Rajas (quality of passion, activity, neither good nor bad and sometimes either, action qua action, individualizing, driven, dynamic).

Iconography

Brahma is traditionally depicted with four faces and four arms. Each face of his points to a cardinal direction. His hands hold no weapons, rather symbols of knowledge and creation. In one hand he holds the sacred texts of Vedas, in second he holds mala (rosary beads) symbolizing time, in third he holds a sruva or shruk — ladle types symbolizing means to feed sacrificial fire, and in fourth a kamandalu – utensil with water symbolizing the means where all creation emits from. His four mouths are credited with creating the four Vedas. He is often depicted with a white beard, implying his sage-like experience. He sits on lotus, dressed in white (or red, pink), with his vehicle (vahana) – hansa, a swan or goose – nearby.

Chapter 51 of Manasara-Silpasastra, an ancient design manual in Sanskrit for making Murti and temples, states that a Brahma statue should be golden in color. The text recommends that the statue have four faces and four arms, have jata-mukuta-mandita (matted hair of an ascetic), and wear a diadem (crown). Two of his hands should be in refuge granting and gift giving mudra, while he should be shown with kundika (water pot), akshamala (rosary), and a small and a large sruk-sruva (laddles used in yajna ceremonies). The text details the different proportions of the murti, describes the ornaments, and suggests that the idol wear chira (bark strip) as lower garment, and either be alone or be accompanied with goddess Saraswati. Brahma is associated largely with the Vedic culture of yajna and knowledge. In some Vedic yajna, Brahma is summoned in the ritual to reside and supervise the ritual in the form of Prajapati.

Brahma's wife is the goddess Saraswati. She is considered to be "the embodiment of his power, the instrument of creation and the energy that drives his actions".

Worship

India

Very few temples in India are primarily dedicated to Brahma and his worship. The most prominent Hindu temple for Brahma is the Brahma Temple, Pushkar. Other temples include a temple in Asotra village, Balotra taluka of Rajasthan's Barmer district known as Kheteshwar Brahmadham Tirtha.
 Brahmaji Temple Chhinch Town,Banswara in Rajasthan Also Lord Brahma Temple.12th century Brahma Temple hear.

Brahma is also worshipped in temple complexes dedicated to the Trimurti: Thanumalayan Temple, Uthamar Kovil, Ponmeri Shiva Temple, in Tirunavaya, the Thripaya Trimurti Temple and Mithrananthapuram Trimurti Temple. In Tamil Nadu, Brahma temples exist in the temple town of Kumbakonam, in Kodumudi and within the Brahmapureeswarar Temple in Tiruchirappalli. There is also a shrine for Brahma in Kandiyur Shiva temple in a rare posture along with his consort Goddess Saraswathi.

There is a temple dedicated to Brahma in the temple town of Srikalahasti near Tirupati, Andhra Pradesh. There are a Chaturmukha Brahma temple in Chebrolu, Andhra Pradesh,  and a seven feet height of Chatrumukha (Four Faces) Brahma temple at Bangalore, Karnataka. In the coastal state of Goa, a shrine belonging to the fifth century, in the small and remote village of Carambolim, Sattari Taluka in the northeast region of the state is found.

Mithrananadapuram temple in Thiruvananthapuram has Brahma as the main deity. There is also a shrine for Brahma in Thiruvallam Parasurama temple.

A famous icon of Brahma exists at Mangalwedha, 52 km from the Solapur district of Maharashtra and in Sopara near Mumbai. There is a 12th-century temple dedicated to him in Khedbrahma, Gujarat and also a  Brahma Kuti Temple in Kanpur. Temples exist in Khokhan, Annamputhur and Hosur.

Southeast and East Asia

A shrine to Brahma can be found in Cambodia's Angkor Wat. One of the three largest temples in the 9th-century Prambanan temples complex in Yogyakarta, central Java (Indonesia) is dedicated to Brahma, the other two to Shiva (largest of three) and Vishnu respectively. The temple dedicated to Brahma is on the southern side of Śiva temple.

A statue of Brahma is present at the Erawan Shrine in Bangkok, Thailand and continues to be revered in modern times. The golden dome of the Government House of Thailand houses a statue of Phra Phrom (Thai representation of Brahma). An early 18th-century painting at Wat Yai Suwannaram in Phetchaburi city of Thailand depicts Brahma.

The name of the country Burma may be derived from Brahma. In medieval texts, it is referred to as Brahma-desa.

Brahma in buddhism is known in Chinese as Simianshen (四面神, "Four-Faced God"), Simianfo (四面佛, "Four-Faced Buddha") or Fantian (梵天), Tshangs pa in Tibetan, Bonten (梵天) in Japanese, and Beomcheon(범천,梵天) in Korean.In Chinese Buddhism, he is regarded as one of the Twenty Devas (二十諸天 Èrshí Zhūtiān) or the Twenty-Four Devas (二十四諸天 Èrshísì zhūtiān), a group of protective dharmapalas.

Indonesia
Hindus in Indonesia still have a high regard for Brahma (Indonesian and Javanese: Batara Brahma or Sanghyang Brahma). In Prambanan there is a special temple made for Brahma, side by side with Vishnu, and in Bali there is Andakasa Temple dedicated to Brahma.

In the past, although not as popular as Vishnu and Shiva, the name Brahma appeared on several occasions. In the legend that developed in East Java about Ken Arok, for example, Brahma is believed to be the biological father of Ken Arok. It is said that Brahma was fascinated by the beauty of Ken Arok's mother, Ken Endok and made her a lover. From this relationship was born Ken Arok. The name Brahma is also used as the name of a mountain in the Tengger Mountains range, namely Mount Bromo. Mount Bromo is believed to be derived from the word Brahma and there was once a sect that believed that Brahmaloka – the universe where Brahma resided – was connected to Mount Bromo.

In the Javanese version of wayang(shadow puppet play), Brahma has a very different role from his initial role. When Hindu society began to disappear from Java and the era of Walisongo's wayang kulit began to emerge, Brahma's role as creator in the shadow puppet standard was given to a figure named Sang Hyang Wenang, while Brahma himself was renamed to Brama (fire) where he was a ruling god. Brama, the son of the figure of Bathara Guru (Shiva). The figure of Brahma in Javanese wayang is fused and mixed with the figure of Agni.

See also

 Brahma (Buddhism)
 Brahma Samhita
 Brahmastra
 Brahma from Mirpur-Khas
 Brahmakumari
 Brahmani
 Demiurge
 Svetovid

References

External links

 Brahma at Encyclopædia Britannica
 Hinduism - Brahma And The Trimurti
 Hindu Brahma in Thai Literature - Maneepin Phromsuthirak

Brahma
Hindu gods
Creator gods
Lokapala
Triple gods
Wisdom gods
Names of God in Hinduism